Saxman may refer to:

 Places
 Saxman, Alaska, named after Professor S. A. Saxman
 Saxman, Kansas
 Saxman, West Virginia, an unincorporated community in Nicholas County, West Virginia

Family name 
 Christopher "Chris" B. Saxman (born 1965, Pittsburgh, Pennsylvania), an American politician
 Ville Saxman (born 1989), a Finnish footballer